State Road 236 in the U.S. State of Indiana exists in two sections.  The western section starts at U.S. Route 41 (US 41) in Parke County, and runs eastward, paralleling its parent that lies to the south, U.S. Route 36 (US 36).  In western Hendricks County it then turns to the southeast and ends at State Road 39 (SR 39), only two miles north of that road's intersection with US 36 in Danville.

The eastern portion is a  route that connects State Road 9 (SR 9) in Anderson with Middletown in Henry Co.

Route description

Western section 
From the western terminus SR 236 heads east.  SR 236 passes through a concurrency with State Road 59 (SR 59) that begins in Guion and heads east towards Milligan.  SR 236 heads towards U.S. Route 231 (US 231).  SR 236 and US 231 have a rshort concurrency.  From US 231, heads east towards North Salem passing through Roachdale.  In North Salem SR 236 has an intersection with State Road 75 (SR 75).  From North Salem SR 236 turns southeast.  The eastern terminus of the eastern section is at three–way intersection.

Eastern section 
From the western terminus of the eastern section at a stoplight with SR 9, SR 236 heads due east towards Middletown.  SR 236 passes over Interstate 69 (I-69).  SR 236 enter Middletown from the west and ends at County Road 800 West.

History 
The eastern section of SR 236 was State Road 67 until SR 67 became concurrent with I-69 from Anderson to Muncie.

Major intersections

References

External links 

Indiana Highway Ends - SR 236

236
Transportation in Parke County, Indiana
Transportation in Hendricks County, Indiana
Transportation in Henry County, Indiana
Transportation in Putnam County, Indiana
Transportation in Madison County, Indiana